The Liberal Socialist Action Party (Partito d'Azione Liberalsocialista) is a minor social liberal political party in Italy. It was founded in 1998 in Rome by architect Bruno Zevi. It is currently led by Nicola Terracciano.

The party describes itself as a left-wing party. It supports strengthening the United Nations and the European Union to promote peace, justice, humanity, freedom and democracy, and wants to "disarm" the Catholic Church and other religious organisations. The party also wants to guarantee full employment in Italy.

It is not represented in the Italian Parliament, the European Parliament, nor in any regional or provincial assemblies.

References 

Liberal socialism
Liberal parties in Italy
Political parties established in 1998
Social liberal parties